Clyde A. Erwin High School is a public high school in Asheville, North Carolina, United States.  The enrollment in 2018–19 was 1,316 students in grades 9–12. The school's mascot is the Warriors / Lady Warriors and the school principal is Chip Cody.

In March 1999, Erwin stopped using "squaw" for its girls' teams because the word was considered offensive, with students selecting "Lady Warriors" in May.

Notable alumni
 Martese Jackson, Canadian Football League player
 Caleb Johnson, winner on the thirteenth season of American Idol
 Loyd King, professional basketball player
 Rashad McCants, NBA player
 Robbie Nallenweg, former Indoor Football League quarterback

References

External links
 
 Great Schools''

Public high schools in North Carolina
Schools in Buncombe County, North Carolina